Elena Gheorghe (born 30 July 1985) is a Romanian singer. In the first half of the 2000s, she joined the Romanian pop group Mandinga, with whom she released two albums. In 2006, she separated from the group and pursued her solo career. She has released three studio albums and one compilation album. She scored a top ten in the Romanian Top 100 with the debut single "Vocea Ta".

Early life and career beginnings 
Gheorghe was born in Bucharest to the family of an Aromanian priest, Gheorghe Gheorghe. Many of her ancestors were Orthodox priests. She has a sister, Ana, who is a journalist and a brother, Costin, former footballer. Her mother, Mărioara Gheorghe is a folk artist. Gheorghe debuted on the folk music scene when she was just three years of age with the song Sus în Deal în Poieniţă. At age 11 she joined the Children's National Palace where she took singing lessons. In 2000 she won the gold trophy Little Bear (in Baia Mare) with One Moment In Time by Whitney Houston. In 2001 she participated in the Mamaia Festival.

Gheorghe is of both Romanian and Aromanian background.

Career

2002–2005: Career as part of Mandinga 

Gheorghe started singing with Mandinga, a very successful band in the Latino genre in early 2003. In June that year, Mandinga released their first album – ...De Corazón. Mandinga was placed 4th in the Romanian National Eurovision Selection in March 2005 with the song My Sun which was awarded a golden disc one year later. In January 2006, she opened her own dance school called Passitos and a month later ended the collaboration with Mandinga, starting her solo career with the help of musical producer Laurenţiu Duţă.

2006–2008: Solo career beginnings 

In June 2006, Gheorghe released her first solo album, entitled Your Voice. In March 2007 Gheorghe won the prize Radio România Actualitaţi for best performing act in 2006 and was nominated for the Best Song of 2006 section with the song Your Voice. In August 2007 at the Romanian Top Hit Music Awards, Gheorghe won the award for Best Song of 2007, with the song Your Brown Eyes. Some of her songs are sung in Aromanian language as Ma ţi s-adar, Lilicea Vreariei, and others.

In 2007, she released her second solo album Te Ador, with the title track becoming a hit as well.

2009: Eurovision Song Contest 

In late 2008, songwriter Laurenţiu Duţă offered Gheorghe a song to submit in the Romanian pre-selection for the Eurovision Song Contest. Around 31 December 2008 it was announced that Gheorghe was one of 24 semi-finalists. She competed in the semi-final and then passed to the National Final on 31 January 2009. There she came second after televoting but the jury helped her win the selection thus representing Romania in the Eurovision Song Contest 2009 with the song "The Balkan Girls". She started a promo tour all over Europe from February to May.

The song was performed in the second half of the first semi-final on 12 May in Moscow, where it came ninth with 67 points. She proceeded to the Grand Final on 16 May. There she performed the 22nd song of the evening and Gheorghe presented a concept show about wooden fairies called Iele in Romania. She came 19th that night gaining 40 points, including 12 points from Moldova, seven from Spain, and five from Turkey and Macedonia, etc.

2010–2012: European recognition and "Disco Romancing" 

After Eurovision she became more famous Europe-wide and released her single "Disco Romancing" which was a smash hit in Romania as well as a top-ten in Hungary and a mild success in Czech Republic, Netherlands, Poland or Slovakia. The following single "Midnight Sun" was a top-ten success in the Dutch Top 40 and in the Romanian Top 100. In 2011 she collaborated with Dony and released the single "Hot Girls" which once again charted throughout Europe. The same year she had her first European tour, getting to Germany, Spain and Greece. Gheorghe's album "Disco Romancing" had a limited release in 2012, in Spain and Japan. The album spawned 3 more singles "Your Captain Tonight", "Amar Tu Vida" and "Hypnotic".

2013–present 

In 2016, Disney Enterprises and Walt Disney Romania chose the artist to be part of an animated TV Series produced by Disney, and she sings the main theme from Elena of Avalor.

In 2019, to celebrate the Aromanian National Day (celebrated every 23 May), Gheorghe organized an Aromanian music event.

In March 2022, she released a new song called "Brațele".

Discography

Studio albums 
2006: Vocea Ta
2008: Te Ador
2012: Disco Romancing
2019: Lunâ Albâ
2022: Brațele

As part of Mandinga 
2003: ...de corazôn
2005: Soarele Meu

Compilations 
2008: Lilicea Vreariei (Elena Gheorghe & Gica Coada)

Singles

References

External links 

 Official hi5 profile
 Official YouTube Channel

 
1985 births
Living people
Eurovision Song Contest entrants of 2009
Musicians from Bucharest
Romanian dance musicians
Eurovision Song Contest entrants for Romania
Romanian women pop singers
English-language singers from Romania
Aromanian-language singers
Romanian people of Aromanian descent
Aromanian musicians